Michael Edward Ryan (born December 24, 1941) is a retired United States Air Force general and was the 16th Chief of Staff of the United States Air Force from October 1997 to September 2001. He served as the senior uniformed Air Force officer responsible for the organization, training and equipage of 700,000 active-duty, Guard, Reserve and civilian forces serving in the United States and overseas. As a member of the Joint Chiefs of Staff, he and the other service chiefs functioned as military advisers to the Secretary of Defense, National Security Council and the President.

Military career

Born in San Antonio, Texas in 1941, Ryan entered the U.S. Air Force after graduating from the United States Air Force Academy in 1965; he was a graduate of Omaha Creighton Prep High School. Ryan's father, General John Dale Ryan, was the 7th Chief of Staff of the United States Air Force, from 1969 to 1973.

He flew combat missions in Southeast Asia, including 100 missions over North Vietnam in F-4 Phantom II, as part of the 13th Tactical Fighter Squadron based at Udorn Royal Thai Air Force Base in Thailand from October 1967 to August 1968. He went through Squadron Officer School in 1969 and the Fighter Weapons Instructor Course at United States Air Force Fighter Weapons School during 1970. From 1971 to 1973, Ryan served as an exchange officer with the Royal Australian Air Force flying the Mirage III. He attended Air Command and Staff College and earned an MBA from Auburn University in 1976. Ryan went to the National War College in 1984. During 1988, Ryan partook in the National Security Program at John F. Kennedy School of Government at Harvard University.

Over his career, Ryan held command at the squadron, wing, numbered air force and major command levels. He also served in staff assignments at the major command level, and in the Pentagon on both the Air Staff and the Joint Staff.

His first assignment as a lieutenant general in 1993 was as the Assistant to the Chairman of the Joint Chiefs of Staff, the duties of which encompassed being the senior military liaison over at the U.S. Department of State and travelling overseas with the Secretary of State.

As Commander of Sixteenth Air Force at Aviano Air Base and Allied Air Forces Southern Europe in Naples, from 1994 to 1996, Lieutenant General Ryan directed the NATO air combat operations in Bosnia-Herzegovina, including the bombing missions of Operation Deliberate Force, which created the context for the U.S. to broker the Dayton Peace Accords between the parties in conflict. Ryan personally approved every NATO target during the two-week Operation Deliberate Force campaign. During his tenure, Captain Scott O'Grady was shot down in a F-16 Fighting Falcon in early June 1995 over Bosnia by a surface-to-air missile launched by the Army of Republika Srpska. O'Grady was rescued a week later.

Before assuming the Chief of Staff position, General Ryan was from April 1996 to October 1997 dual-hatted as Commander of U.S. Air Forces in Europe and Commander of Allied Air Forces Central Europe, with headquarters at Ramstein Air Base in Germany. President Bill Clinton announced the nomination of General Ryan as Chief of Staff of the Air Force on July 31, 1997.

During Operation Allied Force in April 1999, General Ryan made taskings to improve the capability of the Predator drone to collect time-sensitive intelligence for targeting, the results of which would later prove useful in Operation Enduring Freedom. General Ryan formally retired from the U.S. Air Force on October 1, 2001: although the first day on the job of his successor, General John P. Jumper, was on September 11, 2001.

Awards and decorations

Effective dates of promotion

Popular culture
General Michael E. Ryan appeared as himself in the Stargate SG-1 4th season episode 19 "Prodigy", a cable television series filmed in Canada receiving technical assistance from the Air Force Entertainment Liaison Office. He agreed to guest-star on Stargate SG-1 because as he put it, "The ideas that come out of science fiction are often more science than fiction." It also appealed to Ryan's sense of wonder, "The exploration of our own solar system is this century's challenge. It would be a big surprise to find a Stargate out there." Lead actor Richard Dean Anderson later recalled asking General Ryan off camera if he had subordinates as irreverent as Anderson's character Jack O'Neill. According to Anderson the reply was, "Son, yes. We've got colonels like you and worse."

References

External links
 Official USAF Biography
 Appearances on C-SPAN

1941 births
Living people
United States Air Force Academy alumni
Squadron Officer School alumni
Air Command and Staff College alumni
Auburn University alumni
National War College alumni
Harvard Kennedy School alumni
Chiefs of Staff of the United States Air Force
Recipients of the Legion of Merit
Order of National Security Merit members
Grand Cordons of the Order of the Rising Sun
Knights Commander of the Order of Merit of the Federal Republic of Germany
Crosses of Aeronautical Merit
Recipients of the Pingat Jasa Gemilang (Tentera)
Commandeurs of the Légion d'honneur
Recipients of the Air Force Distinguished Service Medal
Recipients of the Air Medal
Recipients of the Coast Guard Distinguished Service Medal
Recipients of the Defense Distinguished Service Medal
Recipients of the Distinguished Flying Cross (United States)
Recipients of the Distinguished Service Medal (US Army)
Recipients of the Navy Distinguished Service Medal
Commanders of the Order of Orange-Nassau
Recipients of the Order of the Sacred Treasure
Recipients of the Order of the Sword (United States)